Iti Srikanta is a 2004 Bengali period drama film directed by Anjan Das. This film is based on novelist Sarat Chandra Chattopadhyay's novel, Srikanta (1917) In an interview in 2005, Das, director of the film, told about his depiction of the character Srikanta– "Several films have been made on Srikanta but all these had mainly dealt with specific chapters from Srikanta, the novel. I wanted to present the complete man — his inner conflict and turmoil over the two women in his life, torn between a baiji and a vaishnavi".  He also felt, the crisis felt by Srikanta as shown in Sarat Chandra Chattopadhyay's novel are still relevant.

This was Soha Ali Khan's debut film, and also of actors, Aparajita Ghosh Das and Bengali film debut of lead actors, Adil Hussain as well as Reema Sen, whose voice was dubbed in the film by Sujan Mukhopadhyay. The film was part of the Indian panorama section at the IFFI in 2004. At the 52nd National Film Awards, Anup Mukhopadhyay was awarded the National Film Award for Best Audiography. also at the 2004 Anandalok Awards, Anjan Das won the award for Best Director.

Plot 
The film is a love triangle between a young man Srikanta (Adil Hussain) and two women in his life, Rajalakshmi (Reema Sen) a rich courtesan  and Kamalata (Soha Ali Khan), a vaishnavite living in an ashram.

Cast 
 Adil Hussain as Srikanta
 Soha Ali Khan as Kamallata 
 Reema Sen as Rajlakshmi
 Pijush Ganguly as Gahar
 Aparajita Ghosh Das as Padma
 Debajit Mondal as

References

External links 
 

2004 films
2000s Bengali-language films
Bengali-language Indian films
Films based on works by Sarat Chandra Chattopadhyay
Films based on Indian novels
Films set in the 1910s
Films that won the Best Audiography National Film Award